Tsaydaychuz Peak, 2758 m (9049 feet), prominence below Howson Peak is 1826 m, is a mountain in the Pattullo Range of the Hazelton Mountains, the southernmost subdivision of the Northern Interior Mountains system of the British Columbia Interior. The Pattullo Range, of which Tsaydaychuz is the highest summit, is located south of Tesla and Eutsuk Lakes and to the north of the Dean River.  To its east is the Nechako Plateau. The first ascent of this peak occurred on 3 September 1978 by Glenn Woodsworth and Carol Evenchick using the Southeast ridge route.

See also
List of Ultras of Canada

References

Hazelton Mountains
Two-thousanders of British Columbia
Range 4 Coast Land District